The five standard dances competition at the 2010 Asian Games in Guangzhou was held on 14 November at the Zengcheng Gymnasium. The five standard dances are the Waltz, Tango, Viennese Waltz, Slow Foxtrot and Quickstep.

Schedule
All times are China Standard Time (UTC+08:00)

Results

Semifinal

Final

References 

 Results
 Report of the Final Round

Dancesport at the 2010 Asian Games